Sergeyevka is a rural locality (a settlement) in Pervomayskoye Rural Settlement, Ertilsky District, Voronezh Oblast, Russia. The population was 398 as of 2010. There are 7 streets.

Geography 
Sergeyevka is located 30 km southwest of Ertil (the district's administrative centre) by road. Pervomaysky is the nearest rural locality.

References 

Rural localities in Ertilsky District